The 2020 FC Dallas season was the club's 25th season in Major League Soccer, the top tier of American soccer. FC Dallas was also to participate in the U.S. Open Cup before its cancelation due to the COVID-19 pandemic in North America.

On March 12, the season entered a month-long suspension due to COVID-19, following the cancellation of several matches. On March 19, the suspension was extended until May 10, and on April 17, the suspension was extended further to June 8. On May 1, the league announced that players will be allowed to resume individual outdoor training at MLS facilities on May 6. On June 10, MLS announced that a bracket format dubbed the "MLS is Back Tournament" would begin July 8 at ESPN Wide World of Sports Complex in Walt Disney World, and end with the final on August 11.

On July 6, MLS announced FC Dallas would not be participating in the MLS is Back Tournament due to a high number of players and technical staff testing positive for COVID-19.

On August 8, MLS unveiled the framework of a revised schedule for the remainder of the 2020 season, with the League's 25th season continuing in the home markets of the 26 clubs beginning August 12 and continuing till September 20 with plans to announce the balance of the regular season schedule by early September. Attendance at matches was determined by MLS and club leadership in accordance with applicable state and local guidelines.

On September 11, MLS announced the regular season match schedule and national broadcast details that cover matches through the end of September along with the qualification and competition format for the 2020 MLS Cup Playoffs. Additional regular season matches were announced at a later date pending further developments regarding travel protocols.

On September 22, FC Dallas announced nine additional matches that Major League Soccer released for the remainder of its 2020 regular season schedule. FC Dallas played one additional match against Nashville SC to complete the 23-game regular season schedule. That match was announced at a later date.

On October 8, Major League Soccer announced the third and final makeup match from the MLS is Back Tournament between FC Dallas and Nashville SC that was played Wednesday, November 4 at 7:30PM at Nissan Stadium in Nashville. Both Dallas and Nashville were forced to withdraw from the MLS is Back Tournament after players and staff from both teams contracted COVID-19.

On October 31, Major League Soccer confirmed that qualification for the Audi MLS Cup Playoffs would be determined by points per game. The league had indicated it would use points per game to determine playoff qualifiers in the case clubs played an uneven number of matches. As a result, the Minnesota United FC game originally scheduled on October 14 was canceled.

Background

Transfers

In 

|}

Draft picks

Out

Club

Roster 
As of October 7, 2020.

Out on loan

Competitions

Preseason 
Kickoff times are in CST (UTC-06) unless shown otherwise

MLS

Western Conference standings 
Western Conference

Overall standings

Results summary

Results by round

Regular season 
Kickoff times are in CDT (UTC-05) unless shown otherwise

MLS is Back Tournament

MLS Cup Playoffs

U.S. Open Cup 

The 2020 Lamar Hunt U.S. Open Cup was cancelled due to the COVID-19 pandemic.

Statistics

Appearances 
Numbers outside parentheses denote appearances as starter.
Numbers in parentheses denote appearances as substitute.
Players with no appearances are not included in the list.

 Goals and assists 

Player name(s) in italics transferred out mid-season.

 Disciplinary record 

Player name(s) in italics'' transferred out mid-season.

Goalkeeper stats 

Player name(s) in italics transferred out mid-season.

Kits

See also 
 FC Dallas
 2020 in American soccer
 2020 Major League Soccer season

References

Dallas, FC
Dallas, FC
Dallas, FC
FC Dallas seasons